The Chengdu Brown goat breed from the Sichuan Province of China, is used for the production of meat and milk.

Sources

Goat breeds
Dairy goat breeds
Meat goat breeds
Goat breeds originating in China